Victoria Reid (~1809 – December 23, 1868) was a woman from the Tongva village of Comicranga, at what is now Santa Monica, California. She is notable for being one of the few Indigenous people granted land by the Mexican Republic, her respected status in Mexican California, her marriage with Hugo Reid, and as the inspiration of Helen Hunt Jackson's Ramona. In her early life she was referred to as Bartolomea Comicrabit, while after her second marriage she was referred to as Victoria. As a respected title, she was referred to as Doña Victoria.

Life

Early life 

Bartolomea was born at Comicranga between 1808 and 1810 as the daughter of the chief of the village.

At the age of six, she was taken from her parents to Mission San Gabriel for conversion and to live in a guarded dormitory.
Bartolomea was given special attention by Eulalia Pérez de Guillén Mariné, keeper of the keys at the mission when she made Bartolomea her assistant at a young age.

First marriage 
He worked at the Yutucubit Rancheria for the mission. This was because throughout the Spanish mission period, recent converts were encouraged to marry within the neophyte population so as to retain control over them and their children as an exploited work force for the mission.

In this marriage, she bore four children, recorded as Felipe, Jose Delores, Maria Ygnacía, and Carlitos. Her first child, Felipe, was born in 1822, when she was just 15 years old. The couple was rewarded two small plots of land known as  near the mission, which meant that she was deemed by the mission fathers to be Hispanicized and Christianized. She became a widow in 1836 with the death of Pablo Maria.

Marriage to Hugo Reid 

In September 1836, she married Hugo Reid, who had first come to California in 1832. Reid was in the process of becoming a naturalized citizen of the Mexican Republic from Scotland, and had changed his name to Don Perfecto Hugo Reid as part of becoming a naturalized Mexican. In the marriage, Bartolomea now became Victoria Reid. Hugo Reid's status in Mexico became elevated by "being the husband of Victoria, a connected mission Indian and well-respected" in the region. Reid further adopted all four of Victoria's children, which has been described as evidence of his affection for her.

This was noted as "one of the few Mexican grants given to an Indigenous person in southern California." The grant was given to her in name alone. Hugo Reid was still in the process of becoming a citizen of Mexico.

In 1839, Hugo's naturalized citizenship was complete and the family built the Hugo Reid Adobe. The adobe still stands today, although it has been modified. In the 1840s, Victoria managed the Huerta de Cuati while her husband managed the Rancho Santa Anita. With help from her son Felipe, Victoria oversaw the expansion of the gardens on her land grant, where she saw the production of 20,500 grapevines and 430 fruit and nut trees.

On August 18, 1843, her son Felipe married Maria de la Resureccion Ontiveros, who came from a landowning family in Los Angeles who settled in the area with the first wave of Spanish colonization in California. This indicated that her children were moving up the social ladder in Mexican California.

In 1844, William Heath Davis recorded upon a visit to the Reid household, that he was "surprised and delighted with the excellence and neatness of the housekeeping of the Indian wife [Victoria], which could not have been excelled. The beds which were furnished us to sleep in where exquisitely neat, with coverlet of satin, the sheets and pillowcases trimmed with lace and highly ornamented." Davis regularly spoke of his low opinions of Indigenous peoples, which indicated that he viewed Victoria as an exception to his perspective.

White American racist attitudes 

After the transfer of Alta California to the United States and California statehood in 1848, Anglo-Americans became the dominant class in the new settler colonial society. The influx of white settlers brought new attitudes toward her marriage and to her status as a respected Indigenous woman. Since interracial marriage was highly discouraged by white Americans, confusion arose as to why a white man would marry an "Indian squaw." Her respected status further confused white Americans, who associated Indianness with poverty and immorality: "Whereas Victoria's land and economic contributions bolstered Hugo Reid's social status in the Mexican period, in the American period, Victoria's social status solidly rested on Hugo's protection and legitimacy."

At the time when Maria Ygnacía, Victoria's daughter, was around 18 years old, she was consistently admired for her beauty by Euro-Americans yet was mischaracterized as being "half-English, half-Indian." This was possibly to create psychological and social distance from accepting that a "full-blooded Indian" was beautiful.

In 1851, Hugo Reid was in declining health and published a series in the Los Angeles Star titled The Indians of Los Angeles County. With the publication of the series, Reid had hopes of becoming an Indian agent for the southern California district both for the payment and to advance the cause of the Indigenous peoples of the Los Angeles Basin, referred to by the Spanish as Gabrieleños (Tongva). Benjamin Davis Wilson saw him as a highly viable candidate because of his "opportunities of knowing the Indians perhaps exceeded those of any in the State."

At this time, Hugo had secretly revealed his growing unhappiness in his marriage with Victoria. This was likely attributed to Victoria's declining status as an Indigenous woman in white American settler society, thus making marriage a damper on his social status. Hugo once copied a note which read "Any man who would cohabit with an Indian places himself on the level of brutes!" He titled this personal note "Anecdote of a Lawyer," which he kept with him for some time.

Declined status and loss of land 
Hugo Reid died in 1852, which left Victoria as an Indigenous woman without the protection of being married to a Euro-American in white settler society. She was quickly assigned a conservator, Benjamin Davis Wilson, and lost control of her property that she had acquired and greatly expanded in the Mexican era. In 1854, Wilson produced a deed to the Huerta de Cuati that claimed he paid Victoria  for the property. However, her signature was only signed with a symbol of a cross, despite Victoria being a literate woman. In 1855, a court appointed Agustin Olvera to be Victoria's administrator for the explicit reason: "because the court considered her incompetent to arrange her own property."

End of life 
Before her death, Victoria made one last visit to Laura Everston King, who she had met with earlier in her life. She was described as wearing a common cotton cloth and wrapped in a quilt, attended to by one Indigenous servant.

At the end of her life, Bartolomea lived at the San Gabriel Mission and died on December 23, 1868, from smallpox. She was then buried in the cemetery of the mission.

Legacy 
She is historically noted as one of the few Indigenous people granted land following the secularization of the Missions by the First Mexican Republic. This was achieved from the support of Eulalia Pérez de Guillén Mariné.

Her marriage with Hugo Reid serves as a motif in Helen Hunt Jackson's Ramona, a romantic myth of the life experiences of Californio society. Jackson does not name Victoria and only refers to her as an "Indian squaw," which flattened her complexity into a white American stereotype.

References 

1800s births
1868 deaths
19th-century Native American women
Tongva
Native Americans in California
History of Los Angeles County, California
California Mission Indians
History of Santa Monica, California